Wang Fanzhi (fl. 7th century) or Brahmacarin Wang was a Chinese Buddhist poet born in Hebi, Henan during the Tang Dynasty. He is the putative author of two collections of early Tang vernacular poetry. The language can be dated to the 8th century. Very few of the poems were known until the Dunhuang manuscripts were discovered in the early 20th century.

The first collection of moralistic verse, "the 92 poems collection", exists in 5 complete manuscripts.

The second collection, "the three-juan collection", has not been found in a complete copy, but has been reconstructed from seven manuscripts. These manuscripts contain poems of a higher artistic value. The content can be compared with the poems in the Hanshan collection.  Wang's language is marked by the use of more colloquial Medieval Vernacular Sinitic than almost any other Tang poet.

Notes

References

Demiéville, Paul. Paris : Collège de France, Institut des hautes études chinoises, 1982. L'Oeuvre de Wang le Zélateur (Wang Fan- tche), suivie des Instructions domestiques de l'Aïeul (T'ai-kong kia-kiao) : Poèmes populaires des T'ang (VIIIe-Xe siècles, édités traduits et commentés après des manuscrits de Touen-houang) . 887 pages
Tafel-Kehren, Dorothee. Bonn, 1982. Einige Gedichte von Wang Fan-chih : Übersetzungen von Texten aus Fonds Pelliot Chiois Ms. 3833. ix, 169 pages
Mair, Victor H. Journal of the American Oriental Society, Vol. 112, No. 2 (Apr., 1992). Script and Word in Medieval Vernacular Sinitic.
Sun, Wang and Zhang, Xihou, "Wang Fanzhi". Encyclopedia of China (Chinese Literature Edition), 1st ed.
Zihan Guo. SINO-PLATONIC PAPERS Number 322 January, 2022 "Self-Reflexive Vulgarity in Wang Fanzhi’s Poetry"

Tang dynasty poets
Tang dynasty Buddhists
Writers from Hebi
Poets from Henan
7th-century Chinese poets